KLT-Golden TV International is a Chinese general entertainment channel of the Golden TV Group in Taiwan. It mainly broadcasts Astro programming.

Programmes

Original programming
 Golden Rooster CNY 2017
 The Travelers
 The Travelers II

i-CABLE Hong Kong
 12 Nights in Guam
 12 Nights in Provence
 12 Nights in Sicily
 12 Nights in Tohoku
 12 Nights in Umbria
 12 Nights in Vienna
 60/80 Seven Up
 All in Good Taste - Chet Lam X Twins Kitchen
 All in Good Taste - Dining Young
 All in Good Taste - Dining Young: Let's Party
 All in Good Taste - Fabulous Cooking Ladies
 All in Good Taste - Yim Ho Pharmacology
 Anywhere Travel DIY
 Arab: A Thousand and One Nights
 Autumn Leaves in Hokkaido
 Benny Li - Story of Taste
 Beijing Fantasia
 Bicycle Diaries
 Big Money
 Big Chefs Small Restaurant
 Big Chefs Small Restaurant 2015
 The Book of Life
 Bravo My Trip Cruise
 CEN Chat Room
 CEN Summer Party
 Career of Seven Ladies
 CoCo's Pregnant Diary
 Cooking Idol
 Cook Odyssey with Master Ko
 Christmas in Tokyo
 Clan of Hong Kong
 Club Addicts
 Dao Tai Yu Cooking Show (I am a Cook/I Cook Therefore I Am)
 Delicious Nexus
 Design King
 Dogs Savior
 Diamond Man of Sheila
 Disappearance of Taste
 Discover Macau
 Eat A Way
 Encore Thailand
 Entertainment H.O.T. 2015
 Emergency Vets
 Emergency Vets 3
 Europe Tetralogy: Barcelona (Red)
 Emergency Vets 2016
 Family Detox
 Fall in Love in San Francisco
 Feng Shui Lecture of Master So
 Feng Shui Lecture of Master So (Season 2)
 Feng Shui Lecture of Master So (Season 3)
 Files of Scotland's Castle
 Fiona X Fiona
 The Food Court
 Fortune College
 Fortune Decoding
 Fortune Tips
 Fortune Tips of Property
 Fortune Tips: Year of the Monkey
 Fortune Tips: Mid-Year of the Monkey 2016
 Germany Travel DIY
 Go Home (House Discuss)
 Golden Dinner with Paco
 H.K. Casa
 H.K. Casa 2016
 Happy Earth
 Happy Earth 2013
 Happy Earth: Europe
 Happy Legend of Wai Ying Hung
 Holidaysss
 Home Boss, Maria
 Home Living
 Hong Kong Asian-Pop Music Festival
 Hong Kong Asian-Pop Music Festival 2017
 I Do (I Need Marriage)
 i-CABLE TV Special: Eruptions of Icelandic Volcano
 I am Hong Kong Guy
 India: A Thousand and One Nights
 Iceland: A Thousand and One Nights
 Japan Travel DIY
 Japan Hotels Ichiban
 Justice League
 Let's Dance! in Korea and Japan
 Let's Go Fun
 Let's Go Fun 2013
 Life on Horizon - Different People, Same World
 Lost in Beijing
 Love Fiji
 Love in Vain
 Love in Vain II
 Love in Vain III
 Love Match Turnaround (Fortune Reason of Luck)
 Loving Pets
 Loving Pets: Monster College
 Maria's Kitchen 6: Delicacy Legend
 Maria's Kitchen 7: Happy Family
 Maria's Kitchen 8: Chinese Secret Recipes
 Maria's Kitchen: Star Series 1
 Maria's Kitchen: Star Series 2
 Maria's Kitchen: Strong Politicians
 Master Chef: Tasting Macau with Maria
 Master Chef vs Pretty Anchor
 Master Chef: Fruitful Tastes of Life
 Master Chef - Home Town Taste (Benny Li)
 Master Chef - History of Food (Martin Yan)
 Master Chef - Martin Yan
 Master Ko's Food Legends (Food Legend of Master Ko)
 Miss Five - A Taste of Life
 Moms and Dads (My Parents)
 Money Buffet
 Mr. Nonsense
 Music Revolution/Real Music
 My Dear Pets
 New Zealand Travel DIY
 Pretty Adventure
 Property Hunt
 Predictions that Shook the World
 Railways in Japan
 Secret Palau
 Smart Kids. Smart Parents - Role Playing Challenge
 Somewhere in Cambodia
 Super Tour
 Star Motion
 Star Chatroom 2014
 Star Chatroom 2015
 Star Chatroom 2016
 Stay Young Legend
 Stylish Mama: Design Competition
 Tai Play 2016
 Tasty Bureau 2014
 Tasty Bureau 2015
 Tasty Bureau 2016
 Tasty Chatroom
 Taiwan Hotels Ichiban
 Taiwan Travel DIY
 Tales of Our City
 Tasty Vincent's Show
 Thailand Travel DIY
 Those People
 Those Memories in Penang
 Those Were the Tastes
 Three Guys Tours
 Tokyo Drift
 Tokyo Glamour
 Tokyo Music: A Thousand and One Nights
 Travel Around the World 40 Days with Master So
 Trips with Guitar
 Trips with Kids
 Trips with Mum
 Under the Spotlight
 Under the Spotlight II
 With Love, Kay
 Wonder 500
 Wong Jing Incident
 What a Wonderful Life

HKICSTV (Horizon)
 Horizon Vacation: China
 Horizon Vacation: Korea
 Prevent Illness
 Sabah, Go! Go! Go!

Fantastic Television (Hong Kong)
 Chapmanology
 The Canine Coach
 Check It Out
 Entrapment
 Extreme Fear
 Francis and Friends (Friends)
 Health (Health-fie)
 Hong Kong is...
 Hong Kong Treasures
 Learning Man
 PAPA Go
 The Pride Moms
 Taiwan Travel Diary
 Trips with Mum 2017

Astro
 Ah Beng 5
 Ah Beng (Sr. 6)
 Axian's Food Adventures II
 Axian's Food Adventures (Sr. 3)
 Axian's Food Adventures Sr4
 BB Bento
 BFF Mini Concert
 Balik Kampung Tour
 Battleground 2011 Final
 Battleground 2014 Korea Special
 Behind The Dialect Groups
 Between Us
 Big Bag GO Cuti (S1)
 Big Bag GO Cuti (S2)
 Big Bag GO Cuti (S3)
 Big Bag GO Cuti Sr.4
 Bright Times
 Budget Foodie
 Budget GO Cuti
 Cabinets of Chinese Metaphysics
 A Century of Chinese Education
 Century Years
 Cin Cai Pun Hua Hee
 D's Diary - Taichung
 DIY Science Show
 Denise's Okinawa Diary
 Europe 360
 Family Go Cuti
 Food Moments
 Garden Of Treasure
 Garden Of Treasure 2
 Good Morning, Teacher!
 Hai Zi
 Hai Zi II
 Hai Zi III
 Hai Zi IV
 Hua Hee Everyday II
 Hua Hee Everyday (Series 3)
 Hua Hee Everyday (S5)
 Hua Hee Everyday (S6)
 Hua Hee Family
 Hua Hee Hokkien Class
 Hua Hee Hokkien Class II
 Hua Hee Kitchen
 Hua Hee Makan I
 Hua Hee Makan (Series 6)
 Hua Hee Makan (Sr. 9)
 Hua Hee Mission
 Hua Hee Seko-lah
 Hua Hee Seko-lah 2
 Hua Hee Together (Season 7)
 Hua Hee Together 8
 I Wonder Why II
 I Wonder Why (Season 3)
 Language Bingo
 Life Moments (S2)
 The Little Traveller (Series 3)
 The Little Traveller (Series 4)
 The Master
 Malaysia My Home: Story of West Malaysia
 Malaysia My Home: Story of Sabah and Sarawak
 Menu Please
 Motif (Mandarin version)
 The Mouse Family
 My New Village Stories
 October
 Our Land
 Our Land (S2)
 Old Street Of Malaysia
 The Parents (Series 2)
 Seven Days
 Simply Crab
 Spain 360
 Stories of SJKC (S2)
 Stories of SJKC (S3)
 Strong Life
 The SOCIAL Camp
 Switzerland 360
 Taste with Jason III
 Taste with Jason IV
 Taste with Jason V
 Taste with Jason IX
 Tasteful Life
 Tasteful Life II
 Tong Tong's Wonderland
 Tong Tong's Wonderland (Season 2)
 The Traditional Trades
 Zig Zag Zoom

Others
 Hong Kong Asian-Pop Music Festival 2018
 Hong Kong Asian-Pop Music Festival 2019
 Hong Kong Neighbourhood Gems

See also
 Kah Lai Toi

External links
 Kah Lai Toi's website

Television stations in Taiwan
2016 establishments in Taiwan
Television channels and stations established in 2016